Peire de Bussignac, Bossinhac, or Bocinhac (fl. c. 1160) was a nobleman, cleric, and troubadour from the Périgord. He was probably from Bussignac in Hautefort, but possibly Boussignac in Tulle. He was, according to his vida, "from the castle of Bertran de Born". Though his vida speaks of "good sirventes" to reproach ladies for bad behaviour and sirventes attacking Bertran, only one sirventes by Peire survives: Quan lo dous temps d'abril, an attack on women as ne'er-do-well gossips.

Sources

The Vidas of the Troubadours. Margarita Egan, trans. New York: Garland, 1984. .

12th-century French troubadours
Year of death unknown
Year of birth unknown
People from Dordogne